Poprati is a village in the municipality of Stolac, Bosnia and Herzegovina.

Demographics 
According to the 2013 census, its population was 250.

References

Populated places in Stolac
Villages in the Federation of Bosnia and Herzegovina